York has, since Roman times, been defended by walls of one form or another. To this day, substantial portions of the walls remain, and York has more miles of intact wall than any other city in England. They are known variously as York City Walls, the Bar Walls and the Roman walls (though this last is a misnomer as very little of the extant stonework is of Roman origin, and the course of the wall has been substantially altered since Roman times). The walls are generally 13 feet (4m) high and 6 feet (1.8m) wide.

History

Roman walls
The original walls were built around 71 AD, when the Romans erected a fort (castra) occupying about 50 acres or 21.5 hectares near the banks of the River Ouse.  The rectangle of walls was built as part of the fort's defences. The foundations and the line of about half of these Roman walls form part of the existing walls, as follows:  
a section (the west corner, including the Multangular Tower) in the Museum Gardens
the north-west and north-east sections between Bootham Bar and Monk Bar
a further stretch between Monk Bar and the Merchant Taylors' Hall, at the end of which the lower courses of the east corner of the Roman wall can be seen on the city-centre side of the existing wall.

The line of the rest of the Roman wall went south-west from the east corner, crossing the via principalis of the fortress where King's Square is now located.  The south corner was in what is now Feasegate, and from here the wall continued northwest to the west corner.  The point where the wall crossed the via praetoria is marked by a plaque in St Helen's Square near the Mansion House.

Multangular Tower
The Multangular Tower in the Museum Gardens is the most noticeable and intact structure remaining from the Roman walls. It was constructed as part of a series of eight similar defensive towers. The walls are almost certainly the creation of Septimius Severus; however, the Multangular Tower is probably a later addition of Constantine the Great around 310–320 AD. It has ten sides, based on a regular fourteen-sided figure designed so that a circle through the internal angles of the internal face is tangential to the curve. The rear four sides are missing to provide access to the interior of the tower. A low plinth or skirt extends out from the lowest course.

The foundations are concrete, atop which the tower extends having a rubble and mortar core between ashlar faced courses of small magnesian limestone blocks.

After the Romans
The Danes occupied the city in 867. By this time the Roman defences were in poor repair, and the Danes demolished all the towers save the Multangular Tower and restored the walls.

The majority of the remaining walls, which encircle the whole of the medieval city, date from the 13th – 14th century. From the east corner of the Roman walls, the medieval wall extends to Layerthorpe Bridge.  After the bridge, the King's Fishpool, a swamp created by the Normans' damming of the River Foss, provided adequate security for the city, and no walls were ever built in this area.

In the Middle Ages the defence of the city was further helped not just by the walls but on the rampart underneath and the ditch surrounding them. The ditch along the walls was once 60 feet (18.3m) wide and 10 feet (3m) deep. In modern times the ditch was  almost all  filled in and no longer exists. For this reason the ground directly around the walls is higher in most places than it would have been in medieval times.

The walls resume beyond the now canalised Foss at the Red Tower, a brick building which has been much restored over the years. They continue south and west around the Walmgate area, terminating in another tower (Fishergate Postern), near York Castle, which was formerly surrounded by its own walls and a moat.

A small stretch of wall on the west side of Tower Gardens terminates at Davy Tower, another brick tower located next to the River Ouse.  This originally ran up to the castle walls, with a postern on Tower Street.

Beyond the Ouse, the walls resume at Skeldergate, where there was once another postern.  They climb past Baile Hill, take a right turn and proceed north-west parallel to the Inner Ring Road.  Near the railway station, they turn right again in a north-easterly direction, finishing at Barker Tower on the Ouse.

Barker Tower was once linked to Lendal Tower by a chain across the river, parallel to the 19th-century Lendal Bridge.  A small stretch of wall then leads to the entrance to Museum Gardens, the Multangular Tower and the original line of the Roman walls.

The walls were repaired during the English Civil War by Parliamentarians as well as during the later Jacobite Risings due to fears of an invasion from Scotland.

The walls were  restored in the Victorian period after falling into disrepair. The Victorians  widened the wall-walk as well as extending it in some areas, (such as in the northern area with views of the cathedral), previously, in some areas, there probably would  have only been narrow ledges that could be used to support a timber wall-walk in times of danger. They also rebuilt the battlements and sometimes the tops of the walls. Some slit windows are at the wrong height and some are narrow for the full width of the parapet. Some parts of the walls still have small holes called musket loops from the 17th century for muskets to fire from although they are of uncertain age due to restoration.  In the northern area  where you have views of the Cathedral, the walls were defended from interval towers which would have been higher  than they are now after the Victorian restoration. Most of the merlons spaced along the walls were added by the Victorians. However, some pre-date this period as can be seen in the 1782 Micklegate Bar  illustration and the 1807 illustration showing the Multangular Tower and walls, although, very few of the original Medieval merlons remain. Perhaps one of the most notable additions to the wall was Robin Hood tower, built in 1889.

Today the walls are a scheduled ancient monument and a grade I listed building.

Bars

The walls are punctuated by four main gatehouses, or 'bars', (Bootham Bar, Monk Bar, Walmgate Bar and Micklegate Bar below). These restricted traffic in medieval times, and were used to extract tolls, as well as being defensive positions in times of war.

Bootham Bar

Although much of Bootham Bar was built in the 14th and 19th centuries, it also has some of the oldest surviving stonework, dating to the 11th century.  It stands almost on the site of porta principalis dextra, the north western gate of Eboracum.  It was named in the 12th century as barram de Bootham, meaning bar at the booths, after the nearby market booths. It was the last of the bars to lose its barbican, which was removed in 1835.

Monk Bar
This four-storey gatehouse is the tallest and most elaborate of the four, and was built in the early 14th century. It was intended as a self-contained fort, and each floor is capable of being defended separately. From 1993 to 2020, Monk Bar housed a museum called the Richard III Experience at Monk Bar and today, it retains its portcullis in working order.

Walmgate Bar
Most of Walmgate Bar was built during the 14th century, although the inner gateway dates from the 12th century. It was originally called Walbegate, the word Walbe possibly being an Anglo-Scandinavian personal name. The Bar's most notable feature is its barbican, which is the only one surviving on a town gate in England. It also retains its portcullis and has reproduction 15th century oak doors.  On the inner side, an Elizabethan house, supported by stone Tuscan order columns (originally of Roman origin but modified in 1584), extends out over the gateway. The house was occupied until 1957.

The Bar has been repaired and restored many times over the years, most notably in 1648, following the 1644 Siege of York in the English Civil War when it was bombarded by cannon fire, and in 1840 after it had suffered years of neglect. It was also damaged in 1489 when, along with Fishergate Bar, it was burnt by rebels who were rioting over tax raises.

Micklegate Bar
The name of this four-storey-high gatehouse is from the Old Norse 'mykla gata' or 'great road', and leads onto Micklegate. It was the traditional ceremonial gate for monarchs entering the city, who, in a tradition dating to Richard II in 1389, touch the state sword when entering the gate.

The lower section was built in the 12th century while the top storeys in the 14th; the original barbican was removed in 1826. At least six reigning monarchs passed through this gate.  
Its symbolic value led to traitors' severed heads being displayed on the defences. Heads left there to rot included: Henry Hotspur Percy (1403), Henry Scrope, 3rd Baron Scrope of Masham (1415), Richard Plantagenet, 3rd Duke of York (1461), and Thomas Percy, 7th Earl of Northumberland (1572).

The Bar was inhabited until the 20th century. The upper two floors contain living quarters, which today are a museum known as the City Walls Experience at Micklegate Bar. A restoration of the Bar was completed in late 2017.

Minor bars
Besides the four main bars, there are two smaller bars.

Fishergate Bar
This Bar originally dates from around 1315, when it was documented as being called Barram Fishergate. It was bricked up following riots in 1489, but was reopened in 1827 and today provides pedestrian access through the walls between the Fishergate area (actually Fawcett Street/Paragon Street) and George Street.

Victoria Bar
As the name suggests, this bar is a 19th-century addition to the walls.  It was opened in 1838 to provide direct access between Nunnery Lane and Bishophill. However, during its construction the remains of an ancient gateway were found beneath it.  This was probably the gateway known in the 12th century as the lounelith or secluded gateway (in comparison to Micklegate Bar or the great bar located four hundred yards away).  This was a small entrance to the city which dated back to early medieval times but was blocked up later with earth and stone, possibly during the period when the walls consisted solely of a wooden palisade before they were rebuilt in stone (from around 1250).

See also 
 List of town walls in England and Wales
 History of York
 Eboracum
 Museum Gardens
 Siege of York

References

Sources

Walking the Walls: An easy stage by stage guide to York's medieval walls. Village. Huntington, York. 1985.
Pauline Beal. Walking the Walls. Village Publishing. 1994.

External links

 York City Walls - information from City of York Council (responsible for caring for the City Walls)
  The Friends of York Walls website
 York' City Walls Trail - by The Friends of York Walls
 A new audio guide using the Guide.AI app - "York's City Walls Audio Trail". See details at https://www.yorkwalls.org.uk/?page_id=8183
 Detailed Walking Tour of York Walls
 The Walls theme on the History of York website

Walls in England
City walls in the United Kingdom
Grade I listed buildings in York
Grade I listed walls
Tourist attractions in York
Scheduled monuments in York
Archaeological sites in North Yorkshire
Roman walls in England
1st-century fortifications